Domenico Someda (Rivolto di Codroipo, 1859 - Udine, 1944) was an Italian painter.

He was born and lived in Udine, in the Friuli region. While in Venice in 1887, he exhibited a large historical canvas depicting the Hungarian Invasion.

References

1850 births
1944 deaths
19th-century Italian painters
Italian male painters
20th-century Italian painters
19th-century Italian male artists
20th-century Italian male artists